Shadeland is a neighborhood in southeastern Lexington, Kentucky, United States. Its boundaries are the University of Kentucky Arboretum to the north and west, Glendover Road to the south, and Tates Creek Road to the east.

Neighborhood statistics

 Area: 
 Population: 204
 Population density: 1,616 people per square mile
 Median household income (2010): $60,264

References

Neighborhoods in Lexington, Kentucky